Murad Artin (born 6 January 1960 in Iraq) is a Swedish-Armenian politician and Left Party member who worked in the Riksdag from 1998 to 2002. Artin was a member of the Committee on Foreign Affairs. Since 2003 he has been a municipal commissioner in the commune of Örebro.

References
 Riksdagen
 Örebro kommun

1960 births
Members of the Riksdag from the Left Party (Sweden)
Swedish people of Armenian descent
Iraqi people of Armenian descent
Iraqi emigrants to Sweden
Living people